Shillong Lajong FC (founded as Lajong SC) is an Indian professional football club based in Shillong, Meghalaya, that competes in Shillong Premier League. The club was incorporated in 1983, with prime objective of improving the declining standard of football in the state, and to spot, train and nurture local talent. In the local Khasi language, Lajong translates to "our own". Nicknamed "The Red Dragons", Shillong Lajong previously participated in I-League, then top flight of Indian football league system.

They are nominated for 2022–23 I-League 2 qualifiers. Headquartered in Shillong, Lajong has access to the largest student population in the North-East and hence the footballing talent right from a young age. The club is four-time champion of the Shillong Premier League.

Shillong Lajong wasp the first club from the North East region of India to rise to prominence in the country. Before the 2012–13 I-League season began, it was officially announced that Shadap had signed his first professional contract with Shillong Lajong after his impressive performance in the North East Super Series during pre-season. Though Aizawl FC caught most of the attention after their I-League title in 2016, it was Lajong who were the torch-bearers of northeastern football for a large part of the decade.

History

Formation and journey
During the finals of the Meghalaya Invitation Cup in 1982, two football enthusiasts Shri Kitdor Syiem and Shri P. D. Sawyan saddened by the continuous failure of the Shillong teams to make it to the final stages of the tournament formed a football club to reverse the trend.

Together with a group of friends and supporters, they commissioned a semi-professional club aptly called Lajong Football Club, literally translating into "Our own" or "Of the people". The club was also known as the Lajong Sports Social and Cultural Club.

In 1983, the club played in the 3rd Division of the Shillong Sports Association League and was the champion, being promoted to the 2nd Division. Similarly in 1984 it was promoted to the First Division. Things started to change rapidly after the title clash for the Shillong Championship was inevitably poised against the Blue Max FC, another professionally organized club which later changed itself to Langsning SC of today. It was only in 1989 that Lajong FC finally annexed the championship for the first time.

In 1990, Lajong FC became the Meghalaya Invitation Cup champion, beating Nabajyoti FC of Guwahati in the final, seven years after its maiden entry.

In 2009, Lajong FC joined the I-League 2nd Division, which then was the second highest national league in India. After one season in the second division, Lajong was promoted to the I-League. Shillong Lajong gained promotion for the 2009–10 season, and had appointed former Salgaocar and East Bengal coach Stanley Rozario for their first season in then India's top flight.

They played their first match in I-League in 2009 and lost to JCT FC 1–5. In their first ever home match, they defeated Air India 3–0 in front of 30,000 people. In their second home match, they lost to Mohun Bagan 2–1, again in front of a home crowd of about 30,000.

At the end of the I-League season, Shillong was relegated to the 2nd division, after finishing in last place.

2010–present
In the 2009–10 Indian Federation Cup, Shillong Lajong reached to the final but lost to East Bengal in penalty-shootout.

For the 2011 season, Shillong Lajong managed by Pradyum Reddy, participated in the I-League 2nd Division. Due to Shillong hosting the 2011 I-League 2nd Division Final Round, they were able to skip the Group stages and go straight into the Final round.

They ended one-year stint in the I-League 2nd Division with a 1–0 victory over Mohammedan SC on 13 May 2011, after which they got promoted back to the I-League, and appointed Scottish manager Desmond Bulpin.

In June 2013, the club roped former Trinidadian international Cornell Glen who represented his country at the 2006 FIFA World Cup. Thus he became the club's first ever World Cup player. In the 2013–14 I-League, on 22 September, Lajong thrashed Dempo SC by 3–0.

In regional stages, Shillong achieved success and emerged as the champions of Shillong Premier League in 2014, 2015, 2016 and 2019. They also emerged champions of the Bodousa Cup in 2016 defeating Assam State Electricity Board SC by 2–0.

Ahead of the 2017–18 I-League season, the club built a strong squad, signing Lawrence Doe, Abdoulaye Koffi, Daniel Odafin, Saihou Jagne and Asian quota player Oh Joo-ho from South Korea.

Alison Kharsyntiew was appointed as interim head coach for the Super Cup, following the dismissal of Bobby Nongbet. His first game in charge was on 4 April 2018 against Indian Super League side Pune City. Despite going down by two goals early in the match, Shillong Lajong came back to win the match 3–2. Going into the 2018–19 season, Kharsyntiew was announced as the club's head coach. His first league match in charge was on 28 October 2018 against Aizawl. A brace from Naorem Mahesh Singh saw Shillong Lajong win 2–1.

The 2018–19 season was not suitable for Shillong Lajong as they were relegated from the league, after suffering a 1–4 defeat at the hands of former champions Aizawl FC in the last match. In that season, Lajong fielded an all Indian squad and appointed Spaniard José Carlos Hevia as technical director and head of youth development.

At the end of the league, Lajong remained at the bottom of the 11-team table, with 11 points from 19 matches. They won the Fair Play Award.

In 2019 Shillong Premier League, they again emerged as the champions with 27 points in 12 matches. In 2021, the club participated in the Shirui Lily Cup in Manipur, organized by the Ukhrul District Sports Association, from November 22 to December 4. They won the 29th edition of the tournament by defeating KLASA 4–3 in the final.

Crest and colours
Nicknamed the Red Dragons, club's official colours are red and white. The home jersey is all red, while the away jersey is all white.

Kit manufacturers and shirt sponsors

Home ground

Shillong Lajong primarily use the Jawaharlal Nehru Stadium in Shillong, as their home stadium for games in Shillong Premier League. They have also used this venue for the games of the older editions of the I-League. The stadium has Astroturf, and has a capacity of 30,000 spectators.

Rivalry

Shillong derby
Shillong Lajong FC shared rivalry with their fellow Shillong-based side Royal Wahingdoh, whom they faced in the I-League previously and face in Shillong Premier League regularly.
Shillong Lajong vs Royal Wahingdoh (Shillong Derby)

Notable players

Foreign players
  Son Min-chol (2012–2015)
  Daniel Bedemi (2009–2010)
  Cornell Glen (2013–2016)
  Aiman Al-Hagri (2017–2018)
  Anil Gurung (2012–2013)
  Yuta Kinowaki (2016–2017)
  Dan Gelu Ignat (2016–2017)
  James Gbilee (2008–2012)
  Fábio Pena (2016–2017)
  Taisuke Matsugae (2013–2014)
  Kondwani Mtonga (2014–2015)
  Edinho Júnior Viegas (2013)
  Aser Pierrick Dipanda (2016–2017)
  Johnny Menyongar (2011–2013)
  Uilliams Bomfim Souza (2013–2016)
  Abdoulaye Koffi (2017–2018)
  Lawrence Doe (2017–2018)

Record

Key
Tms. = Number of teams
Pos. = Position in league
Attendance/G = Average league attendance

Honours

League
I-League 2nd Division
Champions (1): 2011–12
Third place (1): 2009
 National Football League III 
Champions (1): 2006–07
 Shillong Premier League
Champions (4): 2014, 2015, 2016, 2019
 Meghalaya State League
Champions (1): 2019

Cup
Federation Cup
Runners-up (1): 2009–10
 Meghalaya Invitation Cup
Champions (3): 2010, 2011, 2016
 Bodousa Cup
Champions (1): 2016
 Shirui Lily Cup
Champions (1): 2021
 ATPA Shield
Runners-up (1): 2016

Youth section
Shillong Lajong has its youth men's football section and academy teams. Club's U19 team clinched Youth League U18 title in 2017–18 season. Their U17 team also took part in the group stages of 2022–23 U-17 Youth Cup.

Honours
 Youth League U18
Champions (1): 2017–18

See also

 List of football clubs in Meghalaya

References

Further reading

External links

Shillong Lajong FC at Soccerway
 Shillong Lajong FC at WorldFootball.net
 Shillong Lajong FC at the-aiff.com (AIFF)
Shillong Lajong FC at Global Sports Archive

 
Association football clubs established in 1983
Football clubs in Meghalaya
Sport in Shillong
I-League clubs
I-League 2nd Division clubs
1983 establishments in Meghalaya